The Bethpage State Parkway (or simply the Bethpage Parkway) is a  parkway in Nassau County on Long Island, New York, in the United States. It begins at a trumpet interchange with the Southern State Parkway in the village of North Massapequa and serves Boundary Avenue, NY 24, and Central Avenue before terminating at a traffic circle with Plainview Road and a local park road in Bethpage State Park. The parkway is designated as New York State Route 907E (NY 907E), an unsigned reference route. It is also ceremoniously designated as the Philip B. Healey Memorial Parkway for Assemblyman Philip B. Healey (1921–1996).

The Bethpage State Parkway was first proposed by Robert Moses and the Long Island State Park Commission in 1924 to help get people from New York City to parks in Nassau and Suffolk counties. Construction of the parkway began in 1934, and the highway opened on November 14, 1936, along with the Laurelton Parkway (part of the Belt Parkway system) in Queens. The new parkway cost $1.04 million (1936 USD) to construct. Moses proposed extending the Bethpage in both directions, south to Merrick Road via Massapequa State Park and north to Caumsett State Park, via an extended Bethpage and the new Caumsett State Parkway, respectively. Both proposals were not constructed; however, bike paths leading away from both directions of the parkway have been constructed or are under construction. Several scaled-back proposals to extend the Bethpage north have been proposed, including an extension to NY 25A in Cold Spring Harbor and another to NY 135 (the Seaford–Oyster Bay Expressway) in Bethpage.

A bike path was constructed along the Bethpage State Parkway in the 1970s using the alignment once reserved for the southern extension and land along the east side of the current parkway. The Bethpage Bikeway, was extended from its original northern terminus to the Long Island Rail Road station in Syosset. The extension also uses part of the former Long Island Motor Parkway.

Route description 

The Bethpage State Parkway begins at Southern State Parkway exit 31, a trumpet interchange located within the Massapequa Preserve in the hamlet of North Massapequa. On the southbound Bethpage Parkway, the junction is signed as exit B1. From the Southern State Parkway, the Bethpage proceeds northward through North Massapequa and the town of Oyster Bay as a two-lane highway, traversing the northwesternmost part of the Massapequa Preserve. The forests of the preserve serve as a buffer between the highway and the dense neighborhoods of North Massapequa, and this setup follows the parkway to exit B2, a northbound-only exit for Boundary Avenue. Heading northbound, the  stretch prior to the exit gore is two lanes wide.

After passing under Boundary Avenue, the Bethpage Parkway bends to the northwest, leaving the Massapequa Preserve but continuing to run across a wooded strip of land in an otherwise heavily developed area. The highway passes through South Farmingdale on its way into the Farmingdale section of Oyster Bay, where it briefly widens to four lanes and begins to curve northward ahead of exit B3, a partial cloverleaf interchange with NY 24 (Hempstead Turnpike). The southbound cloverleaf ramps connect directly to NY 24, while the northbound ramps use a short section of Beach Street to reach the state route. Continuing northward, the Bethpage State Parkway passes under the Main Line of the Long Island Rail Road tracks and enters Bethpage, where the highway meets Central Avenue at exit B4 just north of the tracks.

While Central Avenue heads west to Bethpage's commercial center, the parkway bends northeastward into Bethpage State Park and connects to Plainview Road and a local park road by way of unsigned exit B5, a traffic circle. The Bethpage State Parkway ends here while Plainview Road connects to the nearby Seaford–Oyster Bay Expressway (NY 135) and the Bethpage State Golf Course. The entire parkway corridor is served by a bike path that runs along the east side of the Bethpage Parkway, and the path continues northwest from exit B5 along the east side of Plainview Road. The Bethpage Parkway was ceremoniously designated February 27, 1997 as the Philip B. Healey Memorial Parkway for Philip B. Healey, a State Assemblyman from Massapequa who died in May 1996. Healey had served the Massapequa area in the Assembly since 1971.

History

Design and construction 

The Bethpage State Parkway was developed as part of a plan proposed by Robert Moses in 1924 that would help people travel in private automobiles from New York City to state parks proposed by the Long Island State Park Commission (LISPC). Moses, president of the LISPC, saw this as a personal mission, having owned a residence in Babylon. While the LISPC was formed to get more state parks, Moses was more focused on building roadways to get to them. Development throughout Nassau County had become common: with a 441% increase in population from 1900 to 1930, it was becoming more urgent to secure open land for parks. The agency was given the right to condemn land for these parks, which led to conflict with locals and other agencies who felt it isolated them from getting money in the development craze. Bethpage State Park was created from land originally owned by Benjamin Yoakum, a railroad executive. In 1923, Yoakum opened a golf course on the land with 18 holes and a country club. Eight years later, in 1931, the LISPC leased the property from Yoakum. It was made into public land a year later, at which point the property was renamed the Bethpage Golf Club. On May 24, 1934, the land which had become Bethpage State Park was sold to the LISPC.

In similarity to parkways designed to access Jones Beach State Park, Moses designed the Bethpage State Parkway as a road that would have a rustic environment. This would include the use of wooden light posts instead of steel, wooden guide rails, and concrete overpasses designed with a stone face. Along with these designs, Moses also confirmed that the parkways would remain free of commercial vehicles and truck traffic. The parkway was designed with a line of woodlands alongside both  lanes. Construction began on the parkway in 1934 even though a date of completion for the rest of the Long Island parkway system—which the Bethpage was intended to connect to—had yet to be established. On November 14, 1936, the recreational parkway was opened to traffic along with the Laurelton Parkway in Queens. Automobiles lined up at the Southern State Parkway in North Massapequa to travel the new parkway, which cost a total of $1.05 million (1936 USD). The ceremonial ribbon was cut at noon, after which Moses spoke praise to the federal government for its assistance and discussed how Bethpage State Park was previously inaccessible. The event was followed by a luncheon at the park.

Extensions 
{
  "type": "FeatureCollection",
  "features": [
    {
      "type": "Feature",
      "properties": {
        "stroke": "#000000",
        "title": "Bethpage State Parkway (Built Segment)",
        "stroke-width": 3
      },
      "geometry": {
        "type": "LineString",
        "coordinates": [
          [
            -73.45262646675111,
            40.70584499294079
          ],
          [
            -73.45277851447464,
            40.7070617825859
          ],
          [
            -73.45380429178478,
            40.708355812390735
          ],
          [
            -73.4561805613339,
            40.711263380091495
          ],
          [
            -73.45728697255255,
            40.71341770154361
          ],
          [
            -73.45843227580191,
            40.71673697876637
          ],
          [
            -73.45942217856647,
            40.71837438385826
          ],
          [
            -73.46082279458643,
            40.71969989394381
          ],
          [
            -73.46322814933957,
            40.72129072530959
          ],
          [
            -73.4652280714363,
            40.72302108129253
          ],
          [
            -73.46687042154373,
            40.72474758094341
          ],
          [
            -73.46819241531195,
            40.726679715917676
          ],
          [
            -73.46975614316763,
            40.73081751151198
          ],
          [
            -73.46998354420067,
            40.732463208284884
          ],
          [
            -73.47007708624005,
            40.734287527691265
          ],
          [
            -73.46989293582739,
            40.73598547233589
          ],
          [
            -73.46960028167815,
            40.73684303413885
          ],
          [
            -73.4689460322261,
            40.73807732577609
          ]
        ]
      }
    },
    {
      "type": "Feature",
      "properties": {
        "stroke": "#cc0000",
        "title": "Bethpage State Parkway (Unbuilt Southern Segment)",
        "stroke-width": 3
      },
      "geometry": {
        "type": "LineString",
        "coordinates": [
          [
            -73.45262646675111,
            40.70585268134201
          ],
          [
            -73.45256770960988,
            40.70494633344892
          ],
          [
            -73.45223863609137,
            40.70174040369788
          ],
          [
            -73.45252035185696,
            40.70056297862858
          ],
          [
            -73.45295352861287,
            40.69943243017418
          ],
          [
            -73.45311203040184,
            40.698184299172446
          ],
          [
            -73.4530450589955,
            40.69628203162763
          ],
          [
            -73.45317187719048,
            40.69488042973609
          ],
          [
            -73.45371183939278,
            40.693606093506425
          ],
          [
            -73.45472873188557,
            40.692305676003606
          ],
          [
            -73.45570530742407,
            40.691410265775026
          ],
          [
            -73.45668624155225,
            40.69010872497236
          ],
          [
            -73.457462573424,
            40.68829641464774
          ],
          [
            -73.458437807858,
            40.68648488130173
          ],
          [
            -73.46091784536839,
            40.68367456187472
          ],
          [
            -73.46241267398001,
            40.6812164601373
          ],
          [
            -73.46347994171083,
            40.680405442109326
          ],
          [
            -73.46504425629975,
            40.6796675781196
          ],
          [
            -73.46579150296749,
            40.67888126851407
          ],
          [
            -73.46602028701456,
            40.67808144164934
          ],
          [
            -73.46613067667933,
            40.6765251764134
          ],
          [
            -73.46651896834373,
            40.6746024248134
          ],
          [
            -73.46719488501549,
            40.67314601314659
          ],
          [
            -73.46890227869154,
            40.67132504059816
          ],
          [
            -73.46981917507948,
            40.67040131221902
          ],
          [
            -73.47024057526141,
            40.66970138713961
          ],
          [
            -73.4702751087025,
            40.668927643345114
          ],
          [
            -73.47043256275357,
            40.66669355517146
          ]
        ]
      }
    },
    {
      "type": "Feature",
      "properties": {
        "stroke": "#cc0000",
        "title": "Bethpage State Parkway (Unbuilt Northern Segment to Northern & Caumsett State Parkways)",
        "stroke-width": 3
      },
      "geometry": {
        "type": "LineString",
        "coordinates": [
          [
            -73.4689439367503,
            40.738075071180006
          ],
          [
            -73.46885678591207,
            40.73826796588731
          ],
          [
            -73.46879934892058,
            40.738616489592054
          ],
          [
            -73.46904049627484,
            40.739439595910056
          ],
          [
            -73.46934756729753,
            40.73992727548583
          ],
          [
            -73.46992772072555,
            40.74047626796434
          ],
          [
            -73.47049152944238,
            40.74115065023278
          ],
          [
            -73.47220303025098,
            40.74382620196789
          ],
          [
            -73.4729494387284,
            40.74483565800274
          ],
          [
            -73.47343605011703,
            40.74582811184047
          ],
          [
            -73.47361290827394,
            40.74728026766082
          ],
          [
            -73.47369421273471,
            40.7496954828352
          ],
          [
            -73.47361533902587,
            40.75080396960294
          ],
          [
            -73.47313069738449,
            40.75239215249948
          ],
          [
            -73.4699027426541,
            40.75999810320618
          ],
          [
            -73.46806534565987,
            40.76289211434501
          ],
          [
            -73.46515590325,
            40.76688501304593
          ],
          [
            -73.46078943461181,
            40.771048745980686
          ],
          [
            -73.45860125496985,
            40.773497374701954
          ],
          [
            -73.4573619067669,
            40.7754968360844
          ],
          [
            -73.45669487491251,
            40.777549426889735
          ],
          [
            -73.45647476613523,
            40.78023792150328
          ],
          [
            -73.45661994069816,
            40.78539956675674
          ],
          [
            -73.45743675716223,
            40.788493200975154
          ],
          [
            -73.4588749241084,
            40.793548866509035
          ],
          [
            -73.45969467423858,
            40.79677143979299
          ],
          [
            -73.46058131195606,
            40.79913371476424
          ],
          [
            -73.46208024770023,
            40.80108634006333
          ]
        ]
      }
    },
    {
      "type": "Feature",
      "properties": {
        "stroke": "#cc0000",
        "title": "Caumsett State Parkway (Unbuilt)",
        "stroke-width": 3
      },
      "geometry": {
        "type": "LineString",
        "coordinates": [
          [
            -73.46207600436175,
            40.801084238296816
          ],
          [
            -73.46240761340597,
            40.80137724770036
          ],
          [
            -73.46381949260831,
            40.80222873945427
          ],
          [
            -73.46605184488,
            40.803522821671
          ],
          [
            -73.46746964380145,
            40.80489034906934
          ],
          [
            -73.46853900700809,
            40.80710406710648
          ],
          [
            -73.46985211595894,
            40.8115770850001
          ],
          [
            -73.47074596211316,
            40.81598661982933
          ],
          [
            -73.47086984664203,
            40.81986735161832
          ],
          [
            -73.46973426640034,
            40.82533315402604
          ],
          [
            -73.46776569262148,
            40.83074168062477
          ],
          [
            -73.46615687012674,
            40.833234213675965
          ],
          [
            -73.45826807431878,
            40.84084809283126
          ],
          [
            -73.456968376413,
            40.84242819420035
          ],
          [
            -73.45623889937998,
            40.843714358821664
          ],
          [
            -73.456019628793,
            40.84559452951919
          ],
          [
            -73.45651885494591,
            40.84905455855983
          ],
          [
            -73.45822356641294,
            40.852231133492026
          ],
          [
            -73.45983607694508,
            40.85951178953632
          ],
          [
            -73.46031770110132,
            40.86192241679629
          ],
          [
            -73.46013857983054,
            40.86528606731943
          ],
          [
            -73.46014922484756,
            40.866214506962194
          ],
          [
            -73.46078013069928,
            40.86748052851881
          ],
          [
            -73.46258525736631,
            40.87145420714988
          ],
          [
            -73.46488039009274,
            40.87406525042784
          ],
          [
            -73.46658459864558,
            40.875906913312505
          ],
          [
            -73.46812108531596,
            40.87721159949923
          ],
          [
            -73.4689497202635,
            40.87881285655079
          ],
          [
            -73.46964273601772,
            40.88077428978396
          ],
          [
            -73.46990492194891,
            40.88325619584998
          ],
          [
            -73.46689187921585,
            40.91450254022977
          ]
        ]
      }
    }
  ]
}During the opening, Moses was already proposing plans to extend the Bethpage southward to NY 27 and Merrick Road in Massapequa. The right-of-way for this new parkway was to cross Massapequa State Park, and as a result, Moses saw no trouble in acquiring the right-of-way. Moses proposed building interchanges at Merrick Road, which would have been a trumpet interchange, and NY 27, which would have been a full cloverleaf. The interchange with the Southern State Parkway would have been upgraded to a full cloverleaf. The design of the extension would be different than that of the original Bethpage Parkway, however, as the designs were refined in the 1950s to make the current parkway and extension a four-lane divided highway instead of the two-lane undivided design used in the 1930s.

In the 1970s, a new bike path was constructed alongside the entire length of the Bethpage State Parkway. The path also continued south to Merrick Road by way of the right-of-way formerly proposed for the Bethpage Parkway's southern extension.

On May 20, 1961, a new parkway was proposed by the LISPC to connect the Northern State Parkway to the proposed Caumsett State Park, the site of a wildlife refuge and arboretum. The parkway would be constructed as a northern extension of the Bethpage State Parkway, using filled land to traverse Cold Spring Harbor. It also required the condemning of a Standard Oil Company tank farm to avoid demolishing high-priced homes, which were to be taken via the three alternate routes proposed. In 1965, the LISPC proposed that the four-lane parkway wind through Cold Spring Harbor and enter the village of Lloyd Harbor. Three years later, however, the LISPC said all they proposed was a scenic and landscaped two-lane road in the future. Conservationists of the Caumsett estate worried that the plans were too vague; furthermore, they believed that Caumsett should not be turned into a major-use facility like that of Jones Beach State Park on the southern shore.

Extending the Bethpage northward was a requirement for building the new parkway, and four new interchanges were proposed for the Bethpage Parkway. The first, exit B5, would be at NY 135 (the Seaford–Oyster Bay Expressway). With this new interchange, the traffic circle with Plainview Road in Bethpage State Park would be eliminated. Other junctions included a diamond interchange for Plainview Avenue and Bethpage State Park, a full cloverleaf interchange with Old Country Road, and a partial cloverleaf interchange with the Long Island Expressway (then-NY 495). North of there, the new Caumsett exits would be a full cloverleaf interchange with the Northern State Parkway, a diamond interchange with NY 25 (Jericho Turnpike) and an interchange with NY 25A and NY 108. After the NY 25A interchange, the parkway would continue north into Caumsett State Park and end at a traffic circle at the southern end of the park.

In 1990, the Long Island Regional Planning Board proposed a new parkway extension to NY 25A in Cold Spring Harbor as part of a 20-year highway improvement program. However, funding sources were not specified. As part of the Long Island Transportation Plan 2000, the New York State Department of Transportation proposed that the Bethpage be extended northwest to NY 135 in Bethpage. In 1987, however, the Long Island Greenbelt Trail Conference proposed that the right-of-way for the Caumsett become part of a new Greenbelt trail. In September 2002, Governor George Pataki announced the opening of Trail View State Park, a new, linear  state park using the former Bethpage and Caumsett right-of-way. The park also included a  trail.

The New York State Department of Transportation is currently constructing the Bethpage Bikeway, a multi-use trail extending  northward from Bethpage State Park to the Syosset station on the Long Island Rail Road. Part of the path will use a former alignment of the Long Island Motor Parkway. The proposed bike trail will cost $6.49 million (2012 USD) and was expected to be completed on July 3, 2012. The contract is slated to expire on December 30, 2012.

The map on the right shows the built segment of the Bethpage State Parkway (black) and the unbuilt segments of the Bethpage Parkway and unbuilt Caumsett Parkway (red).

Exit list

Caumsett State Parkway extension
If ever built, the Bethpage State Parkway extension to the Caumsett State Parkway would have the following interchanges, beginning at the northern terminus of the Bethpage Parkway. The entire route would have been in Nassau County.

References

External links

 Bethpage State Park
 Caumsett State Historic Park
 Bethpage Parkway (Greater New York Roads)

Parkways in New York (state)
Roads on Long Island
Robert Moses projects
Two-lane freeways in the United States
Unfinished buildings and structures in the United States
Transportation in Nassau County, New York